Events from the year 1862 in France.

Incumbents
 Monarch – Napoleon III

Events
6 January - French, Spanish and British forces arrive in Veracruz, Mexico, beginning the French intervention in Mexico.
5 May - Battle of Puebla, victory for the Mexican Army against the French occupational forces.

Arts and literature
3 April - The first two volumes of Les Misérables by Victor Hugo is published.
15 May - The remainder of Les Misérables is published.

Births
28 March - Aristide Briand, statesman, Prime Minister and Nobel Peace Prize winner (died 1932)
6 April - Georges Darien, writer (died 1921)
22 August - Claude Debussy, composer (died 1918)
19 October - Auguste Lumière, filmmaker (died 1954)
7 December - Paul Adam, novelist (died 1920)
8 December - Georges Feydeau, playwright (died 1921)

Deaths
11 January - Jean Philibert Damiron, philosopher (born 1794)
7 February - Prosper Ménière, scientist (born 1799)
11 February - Jules Lequier, philosopher (born 1814)
17 March - Fromental Halévy, composer (born 1799)
9 April - Charles Deval, ophthalmologist (born 1806)
18 June - Jean-Baptiste Pallegoix, vicar apostolic of Eastern Siam (born 1805)
5 July - Étienne-Denis Pasquier, statesman (born 1767)
September - Mathieu-Richard-Auguste Henrion, magistrate, historian and journalist (born 1805)

Full date unknown
Louis Alfred Becquerel, physicist and medical researcher (born 1814)
Antoine Fauchery, photographer (born 1823)
Louis Petitot, sculptor (born 1794)

References

1860s in France